The Iraya language is a language spoken by Mangyans on the island of Mindoro in the Philippines. Zorc (1974) places the Iraya language within the North Mangyan group of Malayo-Polynesian languages, though Lobel (2013) notes that it shows "considerable differences" to Tadyawan and Alangan, the other languages in this group. There are 6,000 to 8,000 Iraya speakers, and that number is growing. The language status of Iraya is developing, meaning that this language is being put to use in a strong and healthy manner by its speakers, and it also has its own writing system (though not yet completely common nor maintainable).

Ethnologue reports that Iraya is spoken in the following municipalities of northern Mindoro island.

Mindoro Occidental Province: Paluan, Abra de Ilog, northern Mamburao, and Santa Cruz municipalities
Mindoro Oriental Province: Puerto Galera and San Teodoro municipalities

Barbian (1977) also lists the location of Calamintao, on the northeastern boundary of Santa Cruz municipality ( up the Pagbahan River from the provincial highway).

The language is not well documented, though a translation of the Bible is available locally.

Dialects and speech registers
There are different dialects spoken in the North East, North West, and Southwest areas. Some of these dialects are the following:

 Abra de Ilog
 Alag Bako
 Pagbahan
 Palauan-Calavite
 Pambuhan

Basic vocabulary and grammar is shared across the dialects. Besides differences in pronunciation, the dialects differ in their preferred usage of words and expressions from the general Iraya vocabulary stock. Furthermore, there are regional borrowings from adjacent languages. Iraya from the lowland, living between the foothills and the plains, adopted some words from Tagalog. Iraya living in the foothills, or on the lower slopes of Ht. Halcon, adopt words from the closely related Alangan language.

This type of speech is used in power songs used by shamans of Occidental Mindoro.  is only understood by Shamans, and other people do not recognize this speech. A recording of the power song can be found in the San Teodoro area of Oriental Mindoro.

Phonemes 
The Iraya languages distinguishes 20 phonemes:

 13 consonants: p, b, m, t, d, l, s, r, k, g, ŋ, ‘
 3 semivowels: w, y, h
 4 vowels: i, a, e [ɨ], o

The following charts illustrate the phonemes by articulation. The consonant  can have both a dental or alveolar point of articulation.

Intonation 
Declarative paragraph: The first sentence starts at a high pitch. Then, each of the next sentences have a lower pitch. The last sentence will have the lowest pitch.

Emotional or dramatic paragraphs: This is the opposite of declarative paragraphs. Each sentence becomes higher than the previous sentence, until the last sentence ends with a more or less higher pitch and long pause.

Syllables 
The following syllable types are used in the Iraya language. (C = consonant; V = vowel)

 CV (e.g.  'you';  'who')
 CVC (e.g.  'why; what')
 CCV (e.g.  'fireworks')
 CCVC (e.g.  'place; put')

In consonant clusters, the Iraya language only uses /w/ or /r/ as the second consonant in an onset cluster, as in the two examples  and  presented above (the latter being a Spanish loanword).

Pronouns 
Nominative (or subjective) and genitive (or possessive) cases are distinguished for pronouns. The Iraya language has dual pronoun forms based on the numeral 'two'. The following table presents the Iraya pronominal paradigm.

Demonstratives 
Zorc (1974) lists the following demonstratives:

Question words 

The two words  and  both translate to 'how much, how many' but have different uses. Examples of these question words are given below:

  'How far (how much distance) is it to town?'
  'How much older am I than you?'

The latter sentence uses  because it is counting age.

Temporal adverbs

Numerals

Vocabulary

References

 
 
 
 

Aeta languages
Northern Mindoro languages
Languages of Occidental Mindoro
Languages of Oriental Mindoro